Wano may be,

Wano language
Wano Township, Kansas 
WANO AM
WANO, World Association of Nuclear Operators
We Are Number One, a 2014 song for the Icelandic children show LazyTown. 
Wano Country Arc, a story arc of the anime and manga One Piece.